Life Begins at 40 Million is an album by The Bogmen.  It was produced by Jerry Harrison. It was by far the more commercially successful of the two Bogmen albums. The album sold more than 50,000 copies.

Critical reception
AllMusic wrote that the album "lacks direction and any semblance of cohesiveness. Interesting it may be, but better than average it isn't." Timothy White, in Billboard, wrote: "There may be other 1995 debuts as fine as Life Begins at 40 Million, but few will be as free of formulas and, yes, uplifting."

Track listing 
All lyrics written by Bill Campion.
All music composed by The Bogmen.

 "The Big Burn"
 "What's Behind Your Coat?"
 "Yellar"
 "The Third Rail"
 "Dr. Jerome (Love Tub, Doctor)"
 "Suddenly"
 "Piss Tongue"
 "Light a Candle for Me"
 "It's a Fast Horizon"
 "Raga"
 "The Doubter's Glass"
 "Englewood"
 "Bonus Track 1"

Personnel
The Bogmen
Bill Campion – acoustic guitar, vocals
Bill Ryan – guitar
Mark Wike – bass
Brendan Ryan – keyboards
Clive Tucker – drums
P.J. O'Connor – percussion, vocals

References

Arista Records albums
1995 debut albums
Albums produced by Jerry Harrison
The Bogmen albums